The second cabinet formed by Mahmoud El Nokrashy Pasha lasted between December 1946 and December 1948. It succeeded the cabinet led by Ismail Sidky who resigned from the premiership on 8 December 1946. Next day King Farouk asked Mahmoud El Nokrashy Pasha, head of the Saadist Institutional Party, to form the cabinet which was announced on 10 December. The cabinet was a coalition government comprising members of the Saadist Institutional Party and the Liberal Constitutional Party and was confirmed by the Parliament on 16 December with 150 confidence against 21 objection votes.

One of the significant tasks carried out by the government was the continuation of the negotiations with the British authorities to finalize the independence of Sudan as proposed by the British. As his predecessor, Ismail Sidky, Nokrashy Pasha could not settle the issue. On 28 December 1948 Prime Minister Mahmoud El Nokrashy Pasha was assassinated, and Ibrahim Abdel Hady Pasha was appointed prime minister.

List of ministers
The cabinet members were as follows:

Muhammad Alluba Pasha was appointed the minister of waqf, but he declined the offer due to his objection to the government program.

References

1946 establishments in Egypt
1948 disestablishments in Egypt
Nokrashy
Cabinets established in 1946
Cabinets disestablished in 1948